Late Night Tales: Django Django is a mix album compiled by British band Django Django, released on 11 May 2014 as part of the Late Night Tales series. The mix includes tracks from artists such as The Beach Boys, Primal Scream, Outkast, Massive Attack and Philip Glass. It also features an exclusive Django Django cover version of The Monkees’ "Porpoise Song".

Track listing

References

External links
 Official Django Django website
 Official Late Night Tales: Django Django page

2014 compilation albums
Django Django